Cody Mizell (born September 30, 1991) is an American professional soccer player who plays as a goalkeeper for the Major League Soccer club New York City FC.

College career
Mizell attended Clemson University, where he was first choice goalkeeper for all three seasons, winning numerous All-American and All-ACC awards as a Tiger. He was named an NCAA All-American and team Most Valuable Player as a true Freshman in 2010.

Professional career

Atlanta Silverbacks
On May 16, 2013, Mizell signed a professional contract with NASL club Atlanta Silverbacks.  Mizell made his professional debut against the New York Cosmos shortly after joining the club. He went on to help Atlanta win the NASL Spring season title and a berth in the 2013 NASL Soccer Bowl.

Tampa Bay Rowdies
On March 27, 2014, Mizell signed a two-year contract with NASL club Tampa Bay Rowdies following a successful trial. He made his debut with the Rowdies on May 24, 2014 in a 3–2 win against rival side Fort Lauderdale Strikers. After making five appearances for the Rowdies in 2014, Mizell and Tampa Bay exercised an option in his contract to terminate it to explore future club considerations.

Knattspyrnufélagið Fram
Mizell signed a contract with Knattspyrnufélagið Fram of Iceland early in 2015. Mizell became an instant starter upon arrival at the historic club, and was named to Iceland's best eleven on May 22, 2015.

Charlotte Independence
Mizell was transferred to United Soccer League side Charlotte Independence on January 1, 2016. After a stellar year in 2017, Mizell was nominated for the USL Goalkeeper of the Year award at the end of the regular season.

Colorado Rapids
On March 2, 2017, Mizell was signed by the Colorado Rapids of Major League Soccer from the Charlotte Independence. Mizell made an appearance on the bench in the season opener before being loaned to the Independence to start the 2017 United Soccer League season.

Tampa Bay Rowdies
Mizell began his second stint with the Rowdies on January 5, 2018.

New Mexico United
On November 6, 2018, New Mexico United announced Cody Mizell as one of the first six signed players in club history, under the guidance of Head Coach Troy Lesesne.

New York City FC
On March 4, 2021, Mizell was purchased by Major League Soccer club New York City FC for an undisclosed transfer fee, signing him through the 2022 season. He returned to New Mexico United on a short-term loan deal on April 15, 2022. After two appearances he returned to NYCFC.

International career
Mizell capped multiple times for the U.S. under-17 national team, making his debut against England U17 at the 35th Mondial Minimes International Tournament in Les Essarts, France. He continued with the youth national team system appearing for the  U.S. Under-18 national team and the U.S. under-20 national team.

Career statistics

Honors
Atlanta Silverbacks
North American Soccer League: 2013 Spring

New York City FC
Campeones Cup: 2022

Individual
Inkasso-Deildin Team of the Season: 2015

References

External links

 Charlotte Independence bio
 Clemson Tigers bio
 U.S. soccer bio

1991 births
Living people
People from Woodstock, Georgia
Sportspeople from the Atlanta metropolitan area
Soccer players from Georgia (U.S. state)
American soccer players
Association football goalkeepers
Clemson Tigers men's soccer players
Atlanta Silverbacks players
Tampa Bay Rowdies players
Knattspyrnufélagið Fram players
Charlotte Independence players
Colorado Rapids players
New Mexico United players
New York City FC players
North American Soccer League players
USL Championship players
United States men's youth international soccer players
American expatriate soccer players
American expatriate sportspeople in Iceland
Expatriate footballers in Iceland